The General Counterintelligence Office was the military counterintelligence agency of Venezuela.

According to the New York Times, the agency was replaced by the Dirección de Inteligencia Militar in 2008.

References

Secret police
Venezuelan intelligence agencies
Military of Venezuela